Across the Imaginary Divide is a 2012 album by banjoist Béla Fleck and jazz pianist Marcus Roberts.

Background
Fleck and Roberts first jammed together in 2009 at the Savannah Music Festival.

Track listing
 "Some Roads Lead Home" (Fleck) - 6:16
 "I'm Gonna Tell You This Story One More Time" (Roberts) - 5:42
 "Across The Imaginary Divide" (Fleck) - 4:42
 "Let Me Show You What To Do" (Roberts) - 4:55
 "Petunia" (Fleck/Roberts) - 5:01
 "Topaika" (Roberts) - 4:33
 "One Blue Truth" (Fleck) - 4:26
 "Let's Go" (Roberts) - 5:58
 "Kalimba" (Fleck) - 6:22
 "The Sunshine And The Moonlight" (Roberts) - 5:37
 "That Old Thing" (Fleck) - 5:07
 "That Ragtime Feeling" (Roberts) - 4:08

Personnel
Béla Fleck - banjo
Marcus Roberts - piano
Jason Marsalis - drums
Rodney Jordan - bass

References

Béla Fleck albums
Marcus Roberts albums
Rounder Records albums